Eugen Richter (30 July 183810 March 1906) was a German politician and journalist in Imperial Germany. He was one of the leading advocates of liberalism in the Prussian Landtag and the German Reichstag.

Career
Son of a combat medic, Richter attended the Gymnasium in his home town of Düsseldorf. In 1856 he began to study Law and Economics, first at the University of Bonn, and later at the Berlin and Heidelberg. He obtained a law degree in 1859. Richter became a strong advocate of free trade, a market economy, and a Rechtsstaat; views he held for all his life. In 1859 he became a civil servant in the judiciary. He achieved some renown for his essay Über die Freiheit des Schankgewerbes (On the liberty of the tavern trade). His liberal views caused some trouble with the Prussian bureaucracy. In 1864 he was elected the mayor of Neuwied, but the president of the provincial government refused to confirm his election result. Richter left the civil service, and became the parliamentary correspondent of the Elberfelder Zeitung in Berlin. In 1867 he entered the Reichstag, and after 1869 also became a member of the Prussian Lower House.

He became the leader of the German Progress Party (Deutsche Fortschrittspartei), after 1884 the German Freeminded Party (Deutsche Freisinnige Partei), after 1893 the Freeminded People's Party (Freisinnige Volkspartei), and was one of the leading critics of the policies of Otto von Bismarck. Richter opposed the Anti-Socialist Laws of 1878 that banned the Social Democratic Party. He said: "I fear Social-Democracy more under this law than without it". In response to rumours that Bismarck was planning to introduce a tobacco monopoly, Richter unsuccessfully sought to persuade the Reichstag to pass a resolution that condemned such a monopoly as "economically, financially, and politically unjustifiable". When Bismarck proposed a system of social insurance that was to be paid for by the state, Richter denounced it as "not Socialistic, but Communistic". From 1885 to 1904 he was the chief editor of the liberal newspaper Freisinnige Zeitung.

Political positions

Opposition to socialism
His novel "Pictures of the Socialistic Future" (1891) is a dystopian novel which predicts what would happen to Germany if the socialism espoused by the trade unionists, social democrats, and Marxists was put into practice. He aims to show that government ownership of the means of production and central planning of the economy would lead to shortages, not abundance as the socialists claimed. Written in the form of a diary by a supporter of the socialist revolution who comes to see the horrors he has wrought, the narrator begins by applauding expropriation, the use of force to prevent emigration, and the reassignment of people to new tasks, all the while assuring doubters that paradise is just around the corner. At one point he asks rhetorically: "What is freedom of the press if the government owns all the presses? What is freedom of religion if the government owns all the houses of worship?" highlighting the abuse of power possible when these are owned by the state. 

It has been described as prescient of what would actually occur in East Germany by Bryan Caplan, an economist, who highlights Richter having predicted several policies which he describes that the East German government really used, such as outlawing emigration and shooting those attempting this, as occurred with the Berlin Wall in reality. He also argues that Richter held, unlike some thinkers critical of socialism, such repression is inherent with its actual practice, rather than a defect. He ascribes this to Richter's personal acquaintance with the original leaders of the German socialist movement, and notes that Richter queried them about the very issues he elucidates in the novel.

Opposition to anti-semitism
Anti-semitism was prevalent in the 1870s in Germany, but when the historian Heinrich von Treitschke and the Court Preacher Adolph Stöcker endorsed it in 1879, what had been a fringe phenomenon gained national attention. Various newspapers (such as the "Berliner Antisemitismusstreit") published articles attacking Jews. A petition to the Reich Chancellor Otto von Bismarck called for administrative measures banning Jewish immigration, and restricting their access to positions in education and the judiciary ("Antisemitenpetition", German Wikipedia).

Although anti-semitism was opposed by Eugen Richter's Progress Party and some National Liberals led by Theodor Mommsen and Heinrich Rickert (father of the philosopher Heinrich Rickert), other National Liberals, and the other parties — Conservatives, Center Party, and Socialists — mostly either stayed aloof or flirted with anti-semitism. In November 1880, a declaration by 75 leading scientists, businessmen, and politicians was published in major newspapers condemning anti-semitism ("Notabeln-Erklärung"). It was signed by among others the Mayor of Berlin Max von Forckenbeck, the anthropologist Rudolf Virchow, the historian Theodor Mommsen, and the entrepreneur and inventor Werner Siemens (founder of Siemens AG).

On 20 November 1880 the Progress Party brought the issue before the Prussian Landtag, asking the government to take a stand on whether or not legal restrictions were to be introduced ("Interpellation Hänel"). The government confirmed that the legal status of Jews was not to be altered, but fell short of condemning anti-semitism. Rudolf Virchow complained in the ensuing debate:
 
 
While on the first day of the debate a consensus seemed to emerge against the anti-semitic movement, on the second day, November 22, 1880 some politicians began to declare their anti-semitism. In his speech, Eugen Richter predicted the eventual consequences of the anti-semitic movement:

He concluded his speech with the words:

Responding to an anti-semitic meeting on 17 December 1880, the Progress Party invited all electors for the Prussian Landtag to a meeting in the Reichshallen on 12 January 1881 to demonstrate that the citizens of Berlin did not support anti-semitism. Eugen Richter delivered a speech before an audience of 2.500 electors, attacking anti-semitic university students:

He turned the anti-semitic accusations around:

Already in February 1880, the German Crown Prince and latter Emperor Frederick III had called the anti-semitic movement in a private conversation with the president of the Jewish corporation of Berlin, Meyer Magnus, "a disgrace for Germany" (in some reports also "a disgrace of our time" or "a disgrace for our nation"). Eugen Richter referred to these words, which the Crown Prince confirmed two days later:

He rejected the claim that the anti-semitic movement had grown from the ranks of craftsmen, workers, and businessmen:

In his concluding words, he called upon his audience:

On 27 October 1881 the Progress Party defeated the anti-semitic "Berliner Bewegung" (Berlin Movement), winning all six seats for the capital, with Eugen Richter gaining 66% of the vote in the first round.

See also
Liberalism in Germany

Notes

Further reading

External links

 Pictures of the Socialistic Future (1891), David M. Hart.
 Pictures of the Socialistic Future; Swan, Sonnenschein, and Company, London, 1893
 Free download of the novel: https://mises-media.s3.amazonaws.com/Pictures%20of%20the%20Socialistic%20Future_Vol_2_2.pdf

1838 births
1906 deaths
19th-century German politicians
19th-century Protestants
Activists against antisemitism
German cooperative organizers
Free-minded People's Party (Germany) politicians
German classical liberals
German Free-minded Party politicians
German male journalists
German male writers
German Progress Party politicians
German Protestants
Heidelberg University alumni
Humboldt University of Berlin alumni
Members of the Prussian House of Representatives
Members of the 1st Reichstag of the German Empire
Members of the 2nd Reichstag of the German Empire
Members of the 3rd Reichstag of the German Empire
Members of the 4th Reichstag of the German Empire
Members of the 5th Reichstag of the German Empire
Members of the 6th Reichstag of the German Empire
Members of the 7th Reichstag of the German Empire
Members of the 8th Reichstag of the German Empire
Members of the 9th Reichstag of the German Empire
Members of the 10th Reichstag of the German Empire
Members of the 11th Reichstag of the German Empire
Politicians from Düsseldorf
People from the Rhine Province
University of Bonn alumni